Ramwadi is a village in the Karmala taluka of Solapur district in Maharashtra state, India.

Demographics
Covering  and comprising 215 households at the time of the 2011 census of India, Ramwadi had a population of 1148. There were 591 males and 557 females, with 143 people being aged six or younger.

References

Villages in Karmala taluka